is a passenger railway station located in the city of Nagahama, Shiga, Japan, operated by the West Japan Railway Company (JR West).

Lines

Station layout
The station consists of one side platform and one island platform connected by an elevated station building. The station has a Midori no Madoguchi staffed ticket office.

Platform

Adjacent stations

History
The station opened on 10 March 1882 on the Japanese Government Railway (JGR). The station came under the aegis of the West Japan Railway Company (JR West) on 1 April 1987 due to the privatization of Japan National Railway. 

Station numbering was introduced in March 2018 with Kinomoto being assigned station number JR-A05.

Passenger statistics
In fiscal 2019, the station was used by an average of 646 passengers daily (boarding passengers only).

Surrounding area
site of the Battle of Shizugatake
Nagahama City Office Kinomoto Branch
Shiga Prefectural Ika High School
Nagahama City Kinomoto Junior High School
Nagahama City Kinomoto Elementary Schoo

See also
List of railway stations in Japan

References

External links

0541407 JR West official home page

Railway stations in Shiga Prefecture
Railway stations in Japan opened in 1882
Hokuriku Main Line
Nagahama, Shiga